The Port Tobacco River is a tidal tributary of the Potomac River located in Charles County, Maryland in the United States. Port Tobacco, the county seat of Charles County from 1658 to 1895, was an active port until that portion of the river became silted and unnavigable. When the railroad bypassed the town, business declined, and the county seat was moved to La Plata, Maryland.

References

External links
Port Tobacco River Conservancy

Rivers of Maryland
Rivers of Charles County, Maryland
Tributaries of the Potomac River